Chris Williamson (born May 5, 1972) is a Canadian alpine skier and Paralympic Champion. His father, Peter, was a speed skater for Canada in the 1968 Winter Olympics and subsequently coached stars such as Mike Ireland and Clara Hughes.

Williamson competed in the 2010 Winter Paralympics in Vancouver, Canada. He became 4th in the Giant Slalom, 6th in the Slalom, 4th in the Super combined, visually impaired, and 6th in the Super-G, visually impaired. His sighted guide at Vancouver 2010 and Sochi 2014 was Nick Brush.

Awards and honours
In 2014, Williamson was inducted into the Canadian Disability Hall of Fame.

References

External links 
 
 Athlete Search Results - Williamson, Chris, International Paralympic Committee (IPC)
 

1972 births
Living people
Canadian male alpine skiers
Paralympic alpine skiers of Canada
Alpine skiers at the 2010 Winter Paralympics
Paralympic gold medalists for Canada
Paralympic silver medalists for Canada
Paralympic bronze medalists for Canada
Medalists at the 2006 Winter Paralympics
Medalists at the 2014 Winter Paralympics
Medalists at the 2002 Winter Paralympics
Canadian Disability Hall of Fame
Paralympic medalists in alpine skiing